Ahlainen is a former municipality in the province of Satakunta, Finland. It was annexed with the city of Pori in 1972. Population of Ahlainen was 2,445 in 1971.

History 
The area was originally held by the people of Huittinen as hunting grounds, which is reflected in the Swedish name Vittisbofjärd. The village and inlet called Keikvesi are named after Keikyä, originally a part of Huittinen. Soon after Satakunta became part of Sweden, the area of Ahlainen and Merikarvia was settled by Swedes. Ahlainen was first mentioned in 1427, when it was a part of the Ulvila parish. It became a chapel community in 1736. Noormarkku was subordinate to the chapel community of Ahlainen until 1861, when Noormarkku became an independent parish, after which Ahlainen and Pomarkku were subordinated to it. Ahlainen eventually became a separate parish in 1908.

In the 17th century, Ahlainen was predominantly Swedish-speaking. By the 18th century, the proportion of Finnish-speakers had grown in the area. During the 19th century, Finnish had become the majority language and most Swedes knew how to speak Finnish. Local priests began to oppose the use of Swedish in church in the 1860s, believing that the local dialect was "distorted" in comparison to standard Swedish. There were 476 Swedish-speakers (out of 3,618 people) living in Ahlainen according to a 1885 census, while a census in 1960 only found one Swedish-speaker out of 2,984 people.  

Ahlainen was consolidated with the town of Pori in 1972. The parish was also merged into the Pori parish.

References

External links 
 

Villages in Finland
Former municipalities of Finland
Ahlainen